Trauma is the seventh album by rapper/producer DJ Quik. It was released in 2005 and sold 100,000 copies through his own independent label Mad Science Records. The album debuted at number forty three on the U.S. Billboard 200 chart, with 24,000 copies sold in its first-week. An all instrumental version of the album was also released.

Background 
Tha album was originally supposed to be released in March 2005 on Warner Bros. Records, but he changed labels and got a distribution deal with Fontana.

DJ Quik spoke on the album with an interview with DubCNN and said "It's the dopest album I've ever done. It's better than "Quik Is the Name", it's a classic. It's hot, it's a new sound. I got the best collaborations, I got some real talented people. I made everybody sound the same, it's not like Nate Dogg sounds better than Wyclef Jean. It's not like that, it's a uniform record. Every record goes into the next record the right way. It's like a movie, it's not even like an album. It's real visual, you can see it and you can feel it. It's recorded real well, I used a lot of real new equipment. And I worked with some of the best musicians on the planet. So it's a unstoppable record, and I look forward to send all these fuckin producers back to the drawing board. And I'm the shit, I think I'm the best right now. Matter of fact, when you hear "Trauma", you gonna think I'm the best too".

Critical response 

Trauma received mixed reviews from contemporary music critics. Allmusic gave the album 3.5/5 stars and wrote DJ Quik is the essence of West Coast hip-hop, having been there from the early days when Compton was asserting itself as the voice of rap as the 1980s bled into the '90s, and Trauma, the rapper/producer's seventh album and first in three years, finds Quik as relevant and potent in both lyrics and beats as when he dropped Quik Is the Name. Never flashy, Quik finds art in simplicity, as with the laid-back groove of "Black Mercedes," and the rapid-fire spitting about relationships and distractions on "Catch 22." Soren Baker of the Los Angeles Times wrote that On his seventh album, Quik enhances both his musicianship and his rapping, updating his sound by focusing on an airy, crisp production style that tones down the funk backbone and draws attention to the groove-driven guitar, horn, drum and turntable work that propels the sonic side of the album.

Commercial performance 
The album debuted at number forty three on the US Billboard 200 chart, with first-week sales of 24,000 copies in the United States. It also entered at number nine on Billboard'''s Top Rap Albums, number thirteen on Top R&B/Hip-Hop Albums and number one on Independent Albums. As of January 31, 2006 the album has sold over 100,000 copies in the United States.

 Track listing 

 Personnel 
Credits for Trauma'' adapted from liner notes.

 John Allis - Engineer
 AMG - Primary Artist
 B-Real - Guest Artist, Primary Artist
 Robert Bacon - Guitar, Horn
 Big Kuntry King - Background Vocals
 David Blake - Composer
 Keith Boskonvich - Background Vocals
 Gina Brucato - Assistant
 Chingy - Guest Artist, Primary Artist
 Erik "Baby Jesus" Coomes - Bass, Guitar
 Adam Deitch - Drums, Percussion
 DJ Coke-E - Scratching
 DJ Quik - Primary Artist
 Nate Dogg - Guest Artist, Primary Artist
 Dave Foreman - Guitar
 The Game - Primary Artist
 Faryal Ganjehei - Stylist
 Brian Gardner - Mastering

 Keith Gretlein - Engineer
 Bernie Grundman - Mastering
 Nathaniel Hale - Composer
 T.I. - Composer
 Willie Hudspeth - Background Vocals
 Wyclef Jean - Guest Artist, Primary Artist
 JellyRoll - Piano
 Jodeci - Guest Artist, Primary Artist
 Ludacris - Guest Artist, Primary Artist
 Midwestern Gluryslappers - Handclaps
 Marcus Miller - Horn
 Cornelius Mims - Bass, Strings
 Todd Moore - Composer
 Jaime Sickora - Engineer
 Adam Shmeans Smirnoff - Guitar
 T.I. - Guest Artist, Primary Artist
 Mark Valentine - Engineer
 German Villacorta - Engineer

Charts

See also
List of Billboard 200 number-one independent albums

References 

2005 albums
DJ Quik albums
Albums produced by DJ Quik
Mad Science Recordings albums